Buru is an island in Indonesia.

Buru may also refer to:

 Buru Island or Turnagain Island (Queensland), Australia
Buru, Cluj, Romania
Buru of Gojoseon
Buru people
Buru language
Hae Buru of Dongbuyeo, king of Bukbuyeo and founder of Dongbuyeo
Buru or Ugali, a cornmeal mush
Buru (beach soccer) (born 1976), Brazilian beach soccer player
Buru (legendary creature), an aquatic animal featured in a foundation myth of the Apatani people